Bansian or Banssian, is a medium-size village in Phillaur tehsil of Jalandhar District of Punjab State, India. It is situated on Phillaur-Nawanshahr Road and located 4.6 km from Nagar, 11.3 km from Phillaur, 54 km from Jalandhar and 115 km from state capital Chandigarh. The village is administrated by a sarpanch who is an elected representative of village as per Panchayati raj (India).

Caste 
The village has schedule caste (SC) constitutes 14.54% of total population of the village and it doesn't have any Schedule Tribe (ST) population.

Transport

Rail 
Phillaur Junction is the nearest train station however, Bhatian Railway Station is 17 km away from the village.

Air 
The nearest domestic airport is located 42 km away in Ludhiana and the nearest international airport is located in Chandigarh also a second nearest international airport is 149 km away in Amritsar.

References 

Villages in Jalandhar district
Villages in Phillaur tehsil